Polymitarcyidae is a family of pale burrower mayflies in the order Ephemeroptera. There are about 10 genera and more than 90 described species in Polymitarcyidae.

Genera
These 10 genera belong to the family Polymitarcyidae:
 Asthenopus Eaton, 1871
 Campsurus Eaton, 1871
 Ephoron Williamson, 1802 (white flies)
 Languidipes
 Povilla Navás, 1912
 Pristiplocia McCafferty, 1990
 Tortopsis Molineri, 2010
 Tortopus Needham & Murphy, 1924
 † Cretomitarcys Sinitshenkova, 2000
 † Palaeoanthus Kluge, 1994

References

Further reading

External links

 

Mayflies
Insect families
Articles created by Qbugbot